In geometry Mukhopadhyaya's theorem may refer to one of several closely related theorems about the number of vertices of a curve due to . One version, called the four-vertex theorem, states that a simple convex curve in the plane has at least four vertices, and another version states that a simple convex curve in the affine plane has at least six affine vertices.

References

Theorems in plane geometry